Une Saison Volée (French for "A Stolen Season") is the third album by French singer Françoiz Breut, released in 2005.

Track listing
Intro (unknown) – 1:08 
La certitude (Jérôme Minière) – 3:23 
Over all (David-Ivar Herman Düne) – 4:46 
Le ravin (Deziel) – 2:53 
La vie devant soi (Federico Pellegrini) – 3:10 
Tambours (unknown) – 0:15 
Ultimo (Fabio Viscogliosi) – 2:43 
Km 83 (Dominique Ané / Dominique Ané, Françoiz Breut) – 5:21 
Sur le balcon (unknown) – 1:05 
Une ville allongée sur le dos (Jérôme Minière) – 4:29 
La boîte de nuit (Philippe Poirier) – 3:41 
Please be angry (André Herman Düne) – 4:06 
Ciudad del mar (Jaime Cristobal Urbican) – 4:24 
Le premier bonheur du jour (Frank Gérald / Juan Zorro) – 3:30 
Contourne-moi (Dominique Ané) – 4:31

2005 albums
Françoiz Breut albums